Josh Earl may refer to:
 Josh Earl (comedian)
 Josh Earl (footballer)